Captain Thomas Durell (1685-1741) was a British naval officer most famous for his role in the capture of the Spanish ship Princesa.

Early life
Thomas Durell was born in 1685 to John Durell, who was the Lieutenant-Bailiff of Jersey and Ann Dumaresq, who was the daughter of Elias Dumaresq, 3rd Seigneur of Augrès.

Early career
Durell joined the Royal Navy in 1697 and was promoted to lieutenant in 1705 after passing the lieutenant's examination. He was promoted to commander in 1716 and was later given command of the 42-gun HMS Speedwell. He was promoted to post-captain in 1720.

Nova Scotia
After the Peace of Utrecht, which ended the War of the Spanish Succession, the British gained control of part of the Acadian lands in modern-day Nova Scotia.

Durell who was in command of HMS Seahorse under the orders of General Richard Philipps, who was the Governor of Nova Scotia, surveyed the coasts and harbours of the newly acquired colony. This service was vital to the British governors; Durell's surveys were later used to create maps of Nova Scotia and the greater area.

For Durell's services there is an island named in his honour near Canso, Nova Scotia named Durell's Island.

Capture of Princesa
During the War of Austrian Succession, Durell took part in the action of 8 April 1740. Durell, who commanded HMS Kent, fought alongside Captain Covill Mayne who commanded HMS Lenox and Captain Lord Augustus Fitzroy who commanded HMS Orford. Together the ships fought at close range with the Spanish man of war Princesa, which was captured and became HMS Princess. During the battle Durell injured his hand.

References 

18th-century Royal Navy personnel
People from Saint Helier
1685 births
1741 deaths